Stanley Joseph Olejniczak (May 31, 1912 – March 1979) was an American football tackle who played one season with the Pittsburgh Pirates of the National Football League. He played college football at the University of Pittsburgh and attended Bellaire High School in Bellaire, Ohio. He later changed his last name to "Olenn" after his football career.

College career
Olejniczak lettered for the Pittsburgh Panthers in 1934.

Professional career
Olejniczak played in twelve games, starting six, for the Pittsburgh Pirates during the 1935 season.

Coaching career
Olejniczak was an assistant coach under George Shotwell for the Halezton High School Mountaineers in Hazleton, Pennsylvania from 1936 to 1937. He was then head coach of the Mountaineers from 1938 to 1942, accumulating a 39-9-1 record. He resigned in August 1943 after the school refused to grant him a leave of absence to remain coaching at the University of Pittsburgh.

Olejniczak was later an assistant coach for the Pittsburgh Panthers under his changed surname of Olenn from 1943 to 1945. He resigned from the team in January 1946 after he, along with assistant coaches Charles Hartwig and Bobby Hoel, refused to work under head coach  Clark Shaughnessy. Shaughnessy became head coach of the Maryland Terrapins in February 1946.

References

External links
Just Sports Stats

1912 births
1979 deaths
American football tackles
Pittsburgh Panthers football coaches
Pittsburgh Panthers football players
Pittsburgh Pirates (football) players
High school football coaches in Pennsylvania
People from Belmont County, Ohio
Players of American football from Ohio